{{Automatic taxobox
| image =
| image_caption =
| taxon = Novopsocus
| authority = Thornton, 1984
| subdivision_ranks = Species
| subdivision = N. caeciliaeN. magnus N. stenopterus 
}}Novopsocus'' is a genus in the Pseudocaeciliidae family, with, until 2008, one described species endemic to New Guinea. It was later found that the specimens of two different species (one of which undescribed) had been mixed, and an individual of a third species was found. The genus is characterised by a flat head with a sharp vertex, narrow, strap-like wings, and antennae with a broad, flattened first flagellar segment in the males of two species.

References

 Thornton, I. W. B. 1984. An unusual psocopteran from new Guinea and its relationships within the Philotarsidae. International journal of entomology. 26: 378-385.
 Cuénoud, P. 2008. A revision of the New Guinean genus Novopsocus Thornton (Psocoptera, Pseudocaeciliidae) with the description of two new species. Revue Suisse de Zoologie. 115 : 331-340

Psocomorpha genera
Pseudocaeciliidae
Arthropods of New Guinea
Endemic fauna of New Guinea